Chester Cathedral Constables are a small team of constables who maintain order and security in and around Chester Cathedral.

History
In December 2011, Chester Cathedral appointed a head constable to lead a new team of volunteer constables to maintain security, and to keep good order within the Cathedral and its precincts.

The two longest serving were assisted with training in 2015 by the local territorial force in Cheshire. Although volunteers, they were not appointed as special constable as they work for a private constabulary. In August and October 2017 they were joined by three former Special Constables, leaving Chester Cathedral Constabulary with five serving cathedral constables.

Present day
In June 2017 a Memorandum of Understanding (MoU) was signed by Chester Cathedral Constables (represented by Inspector Chris Jones) and Cheshire Constabulary (represented by the Chief Constable). Under the terms of the MoU the territorial police force acknowledges the right of sworn cathedral constables to carry rigid batons and handcuffs, and to carry out arrests. The cathedral constables agree to deliver all arrested persons to Cheshire Constabulary for processing and custody. The MoU also acknowledges that the cathedral constables will be the initial point of contact for all policing matters on cathedral Dean & Chapter property, passing offences of a serious nature to the territorial force.

Ranks
In common with other members of the Cathedral Constables Association (CCA), the former positions of Head Constable and Deputy Head Constable have now been replaced with the ranks of Inspector and Sergeant.

The CCA has a national Chief Officer, who is acknowledged by all cathedral constabularies as a strategic leader, but who does not have operational command over any of them.

See also
Cathedral constable
Law enforcement in the United Kingdom
List of law enforcement agencies in the United Kingdom

References

External links

Police forces of England
Church law enforcement agencies